Sun Kuang-ming (born 5 January 1961) is a Taiwanese bobsledder. He competed at the 1984, 1988, 1994 and the 1998 Winter Olympics. He also competed in the luge at the 1984 and 1988 Winter Olympics.

References

External links
 

1961 births
Living people
Taiwanese male bobsledders
Taiwanese male lugers
Olympic bobsledders of Taiwan
Olympic lugers of Taiwan
Bobsledders at the 1984 Winter Olympics
Bobsledders at the 1988 Winter Olympics
Bobsledders at the 1994 Winter Olympics
Bobsledders at the 1998 Winter Olympics
Lugers at the 1984 Winter Olympics
Lugers at the 1988 Winter Olympics
People from Hsinchu
20th-century Taiwanese people